Kafr Thulth is a Palestinian town located on high, flat land south of Azzoun,  south of Tulkarm in the Qalqilya Governorate. According to the Palestinian Central Bureau of Statistics, the town's population was 3,921 in the 2007 census.

Name
Kafr in Syriac means "village" and Thulth means "three" or "a third".

Geography
 
Kafr Thulth is bordered by Azzun to the south, Sanniriya and Biddya villages to the east and Deir Istiya to the west. In 1948, parts of Kharab and Aizab, such as, Salman, al-Moudwer, al-Sheikh Ahmad, al-Ashqar, Ras Tirah, al-Dabha, Kirash Kherba and Ras Atiya — villages or land areas that originally belonged to Kafr Thulth were separated from the town by the Green Line, which forms the border between Israel and the West Bank.

Kafr Thulth's land was extended to the border of the Auja stream and by the 19th century the town's total land area was about 50-60,000 dunams. It had bordered Habla, Jaljuliya, Azzun and Islah, but Kafr Thulth's jurisdiction decreased in 1954; Then, the distance was 924 dunams, while the distance reached up to Kherash Kherba that belong to Kafr Thulth 3,665 dunams.

History

Ottoman era 
In 1517, the village was incorporated into the Ottoman Empire with the rest of Palestine, and in 1596, Kafr Tult appeared in Ottoman tax registers as being in nahiya (subdistrict) of Jabal Qubal under the liwa' (district) of Nablus. It had a population of 13 households and 1 batchelor, all Muslims. They paid a fixed tax rate of 33.3%, on wheat, barley, summer crops, occasional revenues, goats and/or beehives; a total of 1,100 akçe.

In 1838, Kafr Thulth was included in a village list drawn up by Edward Robinson, part of Jurat Merda, south of Nablus, named as Kefr Telet.

In 1852, Robinson described Kafr Thulth as "a ruin", and the same did Victor Guérin in 1870. However, later researchers have noted that both only saw Kafr Thulth from a distance, and might have had it mixed up with the ruin Kufr Qara.

In 1882 the PEF's Survey of Western Palestine described the village (called Khurbet Kefr Thilth) as "a small village on high ground, with two wells. It was in ruins in 1852, but has now a few inhabitants, the ground round is rough and uncultivated."

British Mandate era 
In the 1922 census of Palestine conducted by the British Mandate authorities, Kufr Thelth had a population of 643, all Muslims,  while in the 1931 census Kafr Thulth, (including Khirbat Khris), had 169 occupied houses and a population of 955, still all Muslim.

In the 1945 statistics the population of Kafr Thulth was 1290 Muslims.

Land ownership in 1945

Land usage in 1945

Jordanian era 
In the wake of the 1948 Arab–Israeli War, and after the 1949 Armistice Agreements, Kfar Thulth came under Jordanian rule. It was annexed by Jordan in 1950.

In 1961, the population of Kafr Thulth was 1,213.

1967-present

Since the Six-Day War in 1967,  Kafr Thulth has been under Israeli occupation.

After the 1995 accords, about 10.7% of the land was classified as Area B, the remaining 89.3% as Area C. Israel has confiscated 367 dunums of village land for the construction of the Israeli settlements of Karne Shomron, Ginot Shomron, Ma’ale Shomron and Emmanuel, as well as for the construction of the Israeli West Bank barrier.

References

Bibliography

External links
Palestine Remembered Kafr Thulth Page
Survey of Western Palestine, Map 14:   IAA, Wikimedia commons 
Kafr Thulth Town (including ‘Arab al Khawla Locality) (Fact Sheet), Applied Research Institute–Jerusalem, (ARIJ)
Kafr Thulth Town Profile (including ‘Arab al Khawla Locality), ARIJ
Kafr Thulth, aerial photo, ARIJ
Development Priorities and Needs in Kufr Thulth (including ‘Arab al Khawla Locality), ARIJ
Resumption of Wall constructions in Kafr Thulth and Azzun lands – Qalqiliya governorate August 29, 2005, POICA

Qalqilya Governorate
Towns in the West Bank
Municipalities of the State of Palestine